Pleistorallus flemingi, also referred to as Fleming's rail, is a genus and species of extinct bird in the rail family from the Middle Pleistocene (about one million years ago) of New Zealand. It was a large and stout rail about the same size as the extant takahē. It was described by Trevor Worthy in 1997 from fossil material (a right tibiotarsus and distal left femur) found in coastal deposits near Marton, in the Rangitikei District of the North Island. The genus name Pleistorallus refers to the Pleistocene age of the fossils; the specific epithet honours Charles Fleming (1916–1987) for his contributions to New Zealand ornithology and palaeontology.

References

Fossil taxa described in 1997
Birds described in 1997
Rallidae
Pleistocene birds
Extinct birds of New Zealand
Extinct flightless birds
Extinct monotypic bird genera